RMI (Rocky Mountain Institute) is an organization in the United States co-founded by Amory Lovins dedicated to research, publication, consulting, and lecturing in the field of sustainability, with a focus on profitable innovations for energy and resource efficiency. RMI was established in 1982 and has grown into a broad-based institution with 550+ staff and an annual budget of $120+ million. RMI's work is independent and non-adversarial, with an emphasis on market-based solutions. 

The institute, which includes the Carbon War Room (which merged with RMI in December 2014), operates many global programs.

RMI is headquartered in Basalt, Colorado, and also maintains offices in Boulder, Colorado, New York City, Washington D.C., Oakland, California and Beijing, China.

History
By 1978, experimental physicist Amory Lovins had published many books, consulted widely, and was active in energy affairs in some fifteen countries as a synthesist and lobbyist. Lovins is the leading proponent of the soft energy path.

Later in 1979, Lovins married L. Hunter Sheldon, a lawyer, forester, and social scientist. Hunter received her undergraduate degree in sociology and political studies from Pitzer College, and her J.D. from Loyola Marymount's School of Law. In 1982, Amory and Hunter founded Rocky Mountain Institute, based in Colorado. Together with a group of colleagues, the Lovinses fostered efficient resource use and policy development that they believed would promote global security. RMI ultimately grew into an organization with a staff of around fifty. By the mid-1980s, the Lovinses were featured on major network TV programs, such as 60 Minutes.

The Lovins described the "hard energy path" as involving inefficient liquid-fuel automotive transport, as well as giant centralized electricity-generating facilities, often burning fossil fuels such as coal or petroleum, or harnessing a fission reaction, greatly complicated by electricity wastage and loss. The "soft energy path" which they wholly preferred involves efficient use of energy, diversity of energy production methods (and matched in scale and quality to end uses), and special reliance on "soft technologies" (alternative technology) such as solar, wind, biofuels, and geothermal. According to the institute, large-scale electricity production facilities had an important place, but it was a place that they were already filling in the middle 1970s; in general, more would not be needed. In a 1989 speech, Amory Lovins introduced the related concept of Negawatt power, in which creating a market for trading increased efficiency could supply additional electrical energy to consumers without increasing generation capacity—such as building more power plants.

In recent years, RMI has convened a team of designers and engineers to develop a super-efficient prototype automobile, which they've dubbed the Hypercar.

In December 2014, RMI merged with Carbon War Room, an organization with similar goals but a different approach. In June 2017, RMI merged with WattTime, an organization providing real-time power plant data to consumer devices for automatic dispatchable power consumption. RMI, in 2021, launched Canary Media, a nonprofit newsroom covering the clean energy transition.

Programs 
RMI operates programs in many countries:

 Carbon-Free Electricity
 Carbon-Free Buildings
 Carbon-Free Mobility
 Climate-Aligned Industries
 Breakthrough Technologies
 Climate Intelligence
 Urban Transformation
 Strategic Analysis & Engagement
 Global South
 China Program
 India Program
 US Program.

Electric vehicles 
In January 2008, led by John E. Waters, Bright Automotive launched from RMI with the goal of building on the work of a consortium of organizations, including Alcoa, Google.org, Johnson Controls and the Turner Foundation.

Bright Automotive sought with its Bright IDEA project to develop a brand new,  plug-in hybrid electric (PHEV) fleet vehicle. It launched Bright eSolutions to consult on engineering, design, powertrain, battery technology and plug-in hybrid conversion technology services. Bright Automotive secured a conversion contract with the U.S. Army Tank-automotive and Armaments Command (TACOM) to convert military non-combat vehicles into a parallel PHEV for evaluation, including V2G testing. The venture failed.

Advanced Energy, in partnership with RMI, announced a Request for Information (RFI) for Electric Vehicle Supply Equipment (EVSE) specific to charging stations for plug-in electric vehicles (EV).

Books

Books published by RMI include:

Winning the Oil Endgame: Innovation for Profit, Jobs and Security (2005)  (Available Online in PDF)
Small is Profitable: The Hidden Economic Benefits of Making Electrical Resources the Right Size (2003) 
Natural Capitalism: Creating the Next Industrial Revolution (2000) 
Reinventing Fire: Bold Business Solutions for the New Energy Era (2011) .

Recognition 
Co-founder Amory Lovins received many awards.

See also

Association négaWatt
E. Kyle Datta
Negawatt power
Plug-in Hybrid Electric Vehicle
Soft energy path
Soft energy technology
Transition town

References

External links
RMI
YouTube channel

Climate change organizations based in the United States
Energy policy
Sustainability organizations
Renewable energy organizations based in the United States
Environmental organizations based in Colorado